Laevilitorina wandelensis is a species of sea snail, a marine gastropod mollusk in the family Littorinidae, the winkles or periwinkles.

Distribution

Description 
The maximum recorded shell length is 3 mm.

Habitat 
Minimum recorded depth is 18 m. Maximum recorded depth is 391 m.

References

 Warén A. & Hain S. (1996) Description of Zerotulidae fam. nov. (Littorinoidea), with comments on an Antarctic littorinid gastropod. The Veliger 39(4):277-334.

Littorinidae
Gastropods described in 1905